Maoricicada lindsayi, also known as the Lindsay's cicada, is a species of insect that is endemic to New Zealand. This species was first described by John Golding Myers in 1923. Myers named the species in honour of Charles Lindsay who collected the holotype specimen.

References

Cicadas of New Zealand
Insects described in 1923
Endemic fauna of New Zealand
Cicadettini
Endemic insects of New Zealand